Marie Khoury (born 4 May 2001) is a Lebanese swimmer. She competed in the women's 50 metre freestyle and 50 metre backstroke at the 2019 World Aquatics Championships. She represented Lebanon at the 2022 World Aquatics Championships held in Budapest, Hungary. She competed in the women's 50 metre freestyle and women's 50 metre backstroke events.

References

External links
 

2001 births
Living people
Lebanese female swimmers
Place of birth missing (living people)
Lebanese female freestyle swimmers
Female backstroke swimmers
21st-century Lebanese women